The Men's decathlon at the 2011 World Championships in Athletics was held at the Daegu Stadium on August 27 and 28.

Ashton Eaton started off strongly, taking a 22-point advantage in the 100m over American teammate Trey Hardee, then adding three more points in the long jump.  Oleksiy Kasyanov placed himself in third.  Defending champion Hardee pulled back that advantage to take a 6-point lead after the shot put.  Aleksey Drozdov blew past the field with a 2.14 high jump, but cumulatively it was only a short lived 2-point lead.  And the faster Eaton took the 400m and a 53-point lead over Hardee at the end of Day 1.

The second day was more of the same, Eaton's speed over the 110 hurdles extended his lead to 69 points over Hardee, but considering how much faster Eaton normally is vs Hardee, he didn't extend the lead enough.  Kasyanov was the best of the rest now almost 170 points behind the leaders.  The discus was the reversal of fortunes.  Hardee threw over 3 and a half metres further and took an 8-point lead.  In the pole vault, Eaton's 4.60 was the poorest of the top 16, losing 20 cm to Hardee, while Leonel Suárez vaulted 5.00 to slide into third, barely ahead of Drozdov.  In the javelin, Eaton only managed a 55.16, while Hardee went 68.99 and Suárez bettered that with 69.12 to move into second place by 32 points.  With a 244-point lead, Hardee was not going to be caught from behind.  It was predictable that Suárez needed to finish within 4.8 seconds of Eaton to hold on to silver.  With Suárez' personal best in the 1500m at around 4:16, and Eaton's best around 4:20, it looked like a foregone conclusion.  But Eaton went out aggressively, taking the lead on the final lap and powering close to a 65-second last lap to get a personal best 4:18.94.  Eaton beat Suárez by 5.22 seconds to edge 4 points ahead and take the silver medal.

Medalists

Records

Qualification standards

Schedule

Results

100 metres
Wind:Heat 1: -0.5 m/s, Heat 2: +0.5 m/s, Heat 3: -0.2 m/s, Heat 4: 0.0 m/s

Long jump

Shot put

High jump

400 metres

110 metres hurdles
Wind:Heat 1: -0.8 m/s, Heat 2: -0.7 m/s, Heat 3: -0.5 m/s, Heat 4: -0.1 m/s

Discus throw

Pole vault

Javelin throw

1500 metres

Final standings

External links
Decathlon results at IAAF website

Decathlon
Decathlon at the World Athletics Championships